The Prudenci Bertrana Prize is a literary award for novels written in Catalan. It has been awarded annually since 1968 in honour of the Catalan author Prudenci Bertrana (1867–1941). The winner receives €42,000, and the prize is considered one of the most prestigious awards in Catalan literature.

The Fundació Prudenci Bertrana makes the award in September of each year at a ceremony in Girona. At the same time it makes awards for the best Catalan language poetry, essay, children's literature and website.

Winners

References

External links 

 Literary Awards of Girona (in Catalan)

Catalan literary awards
Awards established in 1968
1968 establishments in Spain